The IV Circuit du Lac was a Formula Two motor race held on 8 June 1952 at the Aix-les-Bains Circuit du Lac, France. The race was run over two heats each of 40 laps, with the winner being decided by aggregate time. The winner was Jean Behra in a Gordini Type 16, who started from pole in both heats, won both heats and set overall fastest lap. Lance Macklin was second in an HWM-Alta and Emmanuel de Graffenried third in a Maserati 4CLT/48. Behra's teammate Robert Manzon set fastest lap in heat 1, but succumbed to mechanical failure in heat 2.

Classification

Race 

1Heat 1 grid; grid places for heat 2 were determined by the finishing order in heat 1
2Trintignant drove in heat 2

References

Circuit du Lac
Circuit du Lac
Circuit du Lac